"Sweet Child o' Mine" is a song by American rock band Guns N' Roses. It appears on their debut album, Appetite for Destruction. In the United States, the song was released in June 1988 as the album's third single, topping the Billboard Hot 100 chart and becoming the band's only US number-one single. In the United Kingdom, the song was released in August 1988, reaching number 24 on the UK Singles Chart the same month. Re-released there in May 1989, it peaked at number six.

Background and composition
During a jam session at the band's house in the Sunset Strip, drummer Steven Adler and Slash were warming up and Slash began to play a "circus" melody while making faces at Adler. Rhythm guitarist Izzy Stradlin asked Slash to play it again. Stradlin came up with some chords, Duff McKagan created a bassline and Adler planned a beat. In his autobiography, Slash said "within an hour my guitar exercise had become something else". Lead singer Axl Rose was listening to the musicians upstairs in his room and was inspired to write lyrics, which he completed by the following afternoon. He based it on his girlfriend Erin Everly (daughter of Don Everly and Venetia Stevenson), and declared that Lynyrd Skynyrd served as an inspiration "to make sure that we'd got that heartfelt feeling". On the next composing session in Burbank, the band added a bridge and a guitar solo.

When the band recorded demos with producer Spencer Proffer, he suggested adding a breakdown at the song's end. The musicians agreed, but were not sure what to do. Listening to the demo in a loop, Rose started saying to himself, "Where do we go? Where do we go now?" and Proffer suggested that he sing that.
An alternate version featuring half a live version, half a newly recorded 1999 version plays during the credits of the movie Big Daddy.

Music video
The "Sweet Child o' Mine" video depicts the band rehearsing in Mendiola's Ballroom at Huntington Park, surrounded by crew members. All of the band members' girlfriends at the time were shown in the clip: Rose's girlfriend Erin Everly, daughter of Don Everly of the Everly Brothers; McKagan's girlfriend Mandy Brix, from the all-female rock band the Lame Flames; Stradlin's girlfriend Angela Nicoletti; Adler's girlfriend Cheryl Swiderski; and Slash's girlfriend Sally McLaughlin. Stradlin's dog was also shown. The video was successful on MTV, and helped launch the song to success on mainstream radio.

To make "Sweet Child o' Mine" more marketable to MTV and radio stations, the song was edited down from 5:56 to 4:13, for the radio edit/remix, with much of Slash's guitar solo removed. This drew the ire of the band, including Rose, who commented on it in a 1989 interview with Rolling Stone: "I hate the edit of 'Sweet Child O' Mine.' Radio stations said, 'Well, your vocals aren't cut.' My favorite part of the song is Slash's slow solo; it's the heaviest part for me. There's no reason for it to be missing except to create more space for commercials, so the radio-station owners can get more advertising dollars. When you get the chopped version of 'Paradise City' or half of 'Sweet Child' and 'Patience' cut, you're getting screwed."

A 7-inch vinyl format and cassette single were released. The album version of the song was included on the US single release, while the UK single was the "edit/remix" version. The 12-inch vinyl format also contained the longer LP version. The B-side to the single is a non-album, live version of "It's So Easy".

On an interview on Eddie Trunk's New York radio show in May 2006, Rose stated that his original concept for the video focused on the theme of drug trafficking. According to Rose, the video was to depict an Asian woman carrying a baby into a foreign land, only to discover at the end that the child was dead and filled with heroin. This concept was rejected by Geffen Records.

This song was used for a teaser trailer premiere of Thor: Love and Thunder, which released on April 18, 2022, and the film itself, including the end credits.

Reception
"Sweet Child o' Mine" placed number 37 on Guitar World's list of the "100 Greatest Guitar Solos." It also came in at number three on Blender's 500 Greatest Songs Since You Were Born, and at number 198 on Rolling Stone's The 500 Greatest Songs of All Time. In March 2005, Q magazine placed it at number six in its list of the 100 Greatest Guitar Tracks. On a 2004 Total Guitar magazine poll, the introduction's famous riff was voted the number one riff of all-time by the readers of the magazine. It was also in Rolling Stone'''s 40 Greatest Songs that Changed the World. It places number seven in VH1's "100 Greatest Songs of the '80s", and placed number 210 on the Recording Industry Association of America (RIAA) Songs of the Century list.

, the song is ranked as the 76th greatest song of all time, as well as the best song of 1987, by Acclaimed Music. The song has sold 2,609,000 digital copies in the United States as of March 2012. In 2017, Paste ranked the song number 10 on their list of the 15 greatest Guns N' Roses songs, and in 2020, Kerrang ranked the song number eight on their list of the 20 greatest Guns N' Roses songs.

Guitarist Slash said in 1990, "[The song] turned into a huge hit and now it makes me sick. I mean, I like it, but I hate what it represents."Cash Box called it a "medium tempo rocker by the new hero's of metal, featuring a nice breakdown" and "standout guitar playing."

Australian Crawl controversy
In 2015, the web page of the Australian music TV channel MAX published an article by music writer Nathan Jolly that noted similarities between "Sweet Child o' Mine" and the song "Unpublished Critics" by the Australian band Australian Crawl, from 1981. The article included both songs, inviting readers to compare the two. It also cited a reader's comment on an earlier article that had originally drawn attention to the similarities between the songs. As of May 2015, this comment no longer appeared on the earlier article. The story went viral quickly, encouraging several comments on both the MAX article and the suggestion that "Unpublished Critics" had influenced "Sweet Child o' Mine", including one from Duff McKagan, bass player with Guns N' Roses when "Sweet Child o' Mine" was written and recorded. McKagan found the similarities between the songs "stunning," but said he had not previously heard "Unpublished Critics."

 Uses in TV and Film 
This track has been used in numerous films, most recently in the 2022 film Thor: Love and Thunder. Other films include:

 Bad Dreams (1988)
 The Wrestler (2008)
 Step Brothers (2008)

Slash performs his guitar solo as a guitarist auditioning for a band in a Capital One commercial in which the theme is "easiest decision in the history of decisions".

Formats and track listings

Personnel
 W. Axl Rose – vocals
 Slash – lead and rhythm guitars
 Izzy Stradlin – rhythm guitar, backing vocals
 Duff "Rose" McKagan – bass guitar, backing vocals
 Steven Adler – drums

Charts

Weekly charts

Year-end charts

Certifications

Sheryl Crow version

The song was covered by Sheryl Crow on the soundtrack to Big Daddy, and released as a bonus track on her third studio album, The Globe Sessions. The recording was produced by Rick Rubin and Crow. A music video for Crow's version was also released, directed by Stéphane Sednaoui. Crow performed the song live at Woodstock '99.

Ultimate Classic Rock profiled the song as part of a series on "Terrible Classic Rock Covers", and Rolling Stone readers named it the fourth worst cover song of all-time. Despite its negative reception, it became a moderate hit in Australia, Canada, Iceland, Ireland and the United Kingdom, and it earned Crow a Grammy Award for Best Female Rock Vocal Performance.

Charts

Taken by Trees version

In 2009, Taken by Trees, the solo project of Swedish singer Victoria Bergsman, former lead singer of the Concretes covered the song for the 2009 John Lewis & Partners Christmas advert, a UK advertising tradition since 2007. It was later announced that the version would be released as their next UK single. It was also used in the promotional trailers for the 2009 remake of The Last House on the Left. The song was also used in the final scene for the 2010 film Life as We Know It''. Bergsman's version reached number 23 on the UK Singles Chart on November 28, 2009, and remained at the spot for six weeks.

See also

 Guns N' Roses discography
 List of best-selling singles in the United States
 List of glam metal albums and songs
 List of Hot 100 number-one singles of 1988 (U.S.)
 List of UK Rock Chart number-one singles of 2010

References

1980s ballads
1987 songs
1988 singles
1989 singles
1999 singles
2009 singles
Billboard Hot 100 number-one singles
Black-and-white music videos
Cashbox number-one singles
Geffen Records singles
A&M Records singles
Rough Trade Records singles
Grammy Award for Best Female Rock Vocal Performance
Guns N' Roses songs
Glam metal ballads
Hard rock ballads
Music videos directed by Nigel Dick
Music videos directed by Stéphane Sednaoui
Sheryl Crow songs
Song recordings produced by Rick Rubin
Songs written by Axl Rose
Songs written by Izzy Stradlin
Songs written by Slash (musician)